National Capital Parks-East (NACE) is an administrative grouping of multiple National Park Service sites east of the United States Capitol in Washington, D.C., and in the state of Maryland.  These sites include:

 Anacostia Park
 Baltimore-Washington Parkway
 Buzzard Point Park and Buzzard Point Marina
 Capitol Hill Parks
 Carter G. Woodson Home National Historic Site 
 Civil War Defenses of Washington – Fort Circle Parks – Includes the Civil War Forts and interconnecting parkways from Fort Greble to Fort Mahan.
 Fort Davis Park
 Fort Dupont Park
 Fort Foote Park
 Fort Stanton
 Fort Washington Park
 Frederick Douglass National Historic Site
 Greenbelt Park
 Harmony Hall
 James Creek Marina
 Kenilworth Park and Aquatic Gardens
 Mary McLeod Bethune Council House National Historic Site
 Oxon Cove Park and Oxon Hill Farm
 Oxon Run Parkway (affiliated area)
 Piscataway Park
 Shepherd Parkway
 Suitland Parkway

NPS Visitor Contact Facilities
The headquarters of NACE is located in Anacostia Park at 1900 Anacostia Drive, SE.  It is not a visitor center, but has an information desk in the lobby and is open to the public 9:00 AM – 4:00 PM, Monday through Friday.

Fort Washington Park has a Visitor Center that is open daily 9:00 AM – 5:00 PM, April through October.  The rest of the year, it closes at 4:00 PM.

Frederick Douglass NHS is open daily 9:00 AM – 5:00 PM, April through October.  The rest of the year, it closes at 4:30 PM.

Greenbelt Park Ranger Station is open daily 8:00 AM to 3:45 PM.  The Park Headquarters is open five days a week 8:00 AM to 3:45 PM.

Kenilworth Park & Aquatic Gardens book store and contact station is open daily 9:00 AM to 4:30 PM.

Mary McLeod Bethune Council House NHS is open daily 9:00 AM – 5:00 PM, April through October.  The rest of the year, it closes at 4:30 PM.

References

External links

 

1965 establishments in Washington, D.C.
Protected areas established in 1965